Tetiana Luzhanska (born 4 September 1984) is a Ukrainian-American former tennis player.

Luzhanska has a career-high singles ranking of world No. 131, achieved on 26 September 2011, and a highest WTA doubles ranking of 99, set on 12 February 2007. In her career, she won two singles titles and twenty doubles titles at tournaments of the ITF Women's Circuit.

Career
Luzhanska won singles titles at $25k tournaments in Monterrey and Saltillo, Mexico. During the 2007 season, she won six doubles titles at $25k tournaments on the ITF Circuit.

In August 2007, Luzhanska and Chan Chin-wei reached the doubles final at the WTA Tier IV event Nordic Light Open in Stockholm, losing to Anabel Medina Garrigues and Virginia Ruano Pascual, in a close three-setter.

Luzhanska retired from professional tennis 2013.

WTA career finals

Doubles: 1 (runner-up)

ITF finals

Singles: 7 (2 titles, 5 runner-ups)

Doubles: 36 (20 titles, 16 runner-ups)

External links
 
 

Sportspeople from Kyiv
American female tennis players
Sportspeople from Bradenton, Florida
1984 births
Living people
Ukrainian emigrants to the United States
Ukrainian female tennis players
21st-century American women